Tapai is an Asian fermented food. Tapai may also refer to
Ernie Tapai (born 1967), Australian football player
Szabina Tápai (born 1986), Hungarian handball player
Wakaf Tapai, a town in Malaysia